Związek Harcerstwa Rzeczypospolitej (Scouting Association of the Republic, ZHR) is a Polish Scouting organization founded on February 12, 1989. At present, Związek Harcerstwa Rzeczypospolitej has over 17,500 members. At present, Związek Harcerstwa Rzeczypospolitej is an associate member of the Confederation of European Scouts.

History

In 1956, after Stalin's and Bierut's death, the communist party youth movement ZMP OH was transformed and renamed to ZHP, the same name the Polish Scouting association had before World War II. After 1958 many pre-war instructors were removed from the new ZHP or marginalized, and the original oath, law, educational content and methods were changed. After pope John Paul II's first pilgrimage to Poland in August 1980, some "non-conforming" instructors inside the ZHP created the Andrzej Małkowski Circle of Scout Instructors (KIHAM), with the objective to restore original Scout ideals. After the 7th Congress of ZHP at the beginning of 1981 rejected all their motions and the martial law was imposed in December 1981, they went underground. The underground movement came to light in the fall of 1988. After they were unsuccessful in reforming the ZHP their way, the ZHR was founded.

Organization
The association is divided into Girl Guide and Boy Scout Organizations which involve:

 Cub Scouts (7–10 years old)
 Boy and Girl Scouts (11–14 years old)
 Boy and Girl Wanderers (15–18 years old)
 Senior Boy and Girl Scouts (over 18).

ZHR is divided into 13 Districts. Each District consists of a girl scout company and a boy scout company. The companies consists of troops which consist of squads.

The logo of the ZHR and the Boy Scout Organization is a white Fleur-de-Lis with the Polish Flag. The logo of the Girl Guide Organization is a modified ZHR logo on a blue trefoil.

See also
 History of the Scout movement in Poland

Notes

External links
official homepage (Polish, English)
official English homepage
Girl Scouts homepage (Polish)
Boy Scouts homepage (Polish)

Non-aligned Scouting organizations
Youth organisations based in Poland
Youth organizations established in 1989
Scouting and Guiding in Poland